The 2016 Minya pogrom was a pogrom in a village in Minya Governorate, Egypt, by a Muslim mob against the Coptic community. The pogrom was instigated by a rumor that a Christian man and a Muslim woman were in a relationship. The mob ransacked and torched seven Christian homes. The mother of the Christian man was stripped naked and was paraded through the village to humiliate her.

References

Pogroms
Riots and civil disorder in Egypt
Minya pogrom
Persecution of Copts
Islamism in Egypt
Minya pogrom